Uluç Bayraktar (born 1974) is a Turkish director. He graduated from Ege University with degrees in cinema and television. He is known as the director of İçerde, Ezel, Menekşe ile Halil and Karadayi which has won four awards. He started his director career as assistant to Çağan Irmak.

External links

Turkish film directors
Living people
1974 births
Place of birth missing (living people)
Date of birth missing (living people)
Ege University alumni